New Jazz Conceptions is the debut album by jazz musician Bill Evans, released in 1957 on Riverside Records.

History
Producer Orrin Keepnews of Riverside Records first determined to record Evans after hearing a tape of his playing. Eleven songs were recorded in the first session, including Evans' own "Waltz for Debby", which would prove to be his most recognized and recorded composition.

New Jazz Conceptions was reissued in 2006 with a bonus track.

Reception

Although a critical success that gained positive reviews in Down Beat and Metronome magazines, New Jazz Conceptions was initially a financial failure, selling only 800 copies the first year.

Writing for Allmusic, music critic Scott Yanow said about the album: "Bill Evans' debut as a leader found the 27-year-old pianist already sounding much different than the usual Bud Powell-influenced keyboardists of the time... A strong start to a rather significant career." David Rickert of All About Jazz noted the influence of Bud Powell and wrote "Even at this stage he had the chops to make this a good piano jazz album, but in the end it's not a very good Bill Evans album... There are glimpses of the later trademarks of Evans' style..."

Track listing
"I Love You" (Cole Porter) – 3:55
"Five" (Bill Evans) – 4:03
"I Got It Bad (And That Ain't Good)" (Duke Ellington, Paul Francis Webster) – 1:39
"Conception" (George Shearing) – 4:47
"Easy Living" (Leo Robin, Ralph Rainger) – 3:53
"Displacement" (Evans) – 2:36
"Speak Low" (Kurt Weill, Ogden Nash) – 5:10
"Waltz for Debby" (Evans, Gene Lees) – 1:20
"Our Delight" (Tadd Dameron) – 4:47
"My Romance" (Richard Rodgers, Lorenz Hart) – 2:01
"No Cover, No Minimum" [Take 1] (Evans) – 8:14 Not part of original LP
"No Cover, No Minimum" – 7:31

Personnel 
 Bill Evans - Piano
 Teddy Kotick - Bass
 Paul Motian - Drums

Production
 Orrin Keepnews - Producer
 Bill Grauer - Producer
 Jack Higgins - Engineer
 Tamaki Beck - Mastering

References

1957 debut albums
Bill Evans albums
Riverside Records albums
Albums produced by Orrin Keepnews